James Hutchins Baker (1848–1925) was an American academic administrator who served as the president of the University of Colorado from 1892 to 1914.

Biography 
Born on October 13, 1848, in Harmony, Maine, James Baker attended Bates College in Lewiston before becoming the principal of Yarmouth High School in Yarmouth. He moved to Denver, Colorado in 1875 and worked in secondary school administration until 1891.

He served as the president of the University of Colorado from 1892 to 1914.

He was a member of several prominent educational associations, including the Committee of Ten which convened in 1892 to evaluate practices in American high schools and make recommendations for changes.

His Elementary Psychology (1890) was widely used as a textbook in high schools and normal schools.

Personal life 
He married Jennie Hilton on June 20, 1882, having two children.

James Baker died from pneumonia in Denver on September 10, 1925. He was buried in Fairmount Cemetery.

Publications 
 Elementary Psychology (1890)
 Review of the Report of the Committee of Ten (1894)
 University Ideals (1897)
 American University Progress and College Reform Relative to School and Society (1916)
 After the War—what? (1918)
 Of Himself and Other Things (1922)

See also 
 List of Bates College people

References

External links 
 

1848 births
1925 deaths
American school administrators
Bates College alumni
Burials at Fairmount Cemetery (Denver, Colorado)
Educators from Maine
People from Harmony, Maine
Presidents of the University of Colorado System